Lagos Cougars is a 2013 Nigerian romantic drama film directed by Desmond Elliot. It premiered on 3 December 2013 at the Silverbird Galleria, Victoria Island.
The film revolves around the life of 3 corporate women; Elsie (Monalisa Chinda), Aret (Uche Jombo) and Joke (Daniella Okeke) in their quest to find love and explore their fantasies.

Cast
Monalisa Chinda as Elsie 
Uche Jombo as Aret
Ifeanyi Kalu as Jite
Daniella Okeke as Joke
Shawn faqua as Vincent 
Benjamin Touitou as Lawrence
Alex Ekubo as Chigo

Reception
The film was panned by critics. Nollywood Reinvented gave it an 18% rating, stating that the storyline and directing was poor and very unoriginal.

YNaija played down the love chemistry between Monalisa Chinda & her young lover Benjamin Touitou. It was also  critical of the uneven directing of the film. The review concluded that "Lagos Cougars was funny but not always for the right reasons".

Sodas and Popcorn stated in its review that the story was "...predictable and cliche ridden...".

See also
 List of Nigerian films of 2013

References

Nigerian romantic drama films
English-language Nigerian films
Films set in Lagos
2010s English-language films